Moore Memorial Park and Cultural Center is a historic site in Mims, Florida. The site, which was the home of civil rights leader Harry T. Moore, now houses a museum, conference center and park.

History

Harry T. Moore was a teacher and civil rights leader who organized a variety of initiatives in Florida. He founded the first chapter of the NAACP in Brevard County and in 1938, sued the school district in order to receive equal pay for black teachers. Gilbert v. Board of Public Instruction of Brevard County reached the Florida Supreme Court, where the court ruled in favor of the district.

On December 25, 1951, Moore and his wife were assassinated when a bomb was placed under their house. They are believed to be the first civil rights activists to be assassinated during the movement.

In 1994, Brevard County bought the land where the Moore's house once stood. A nonprofit organization was organized to raise money for the site, and in 2004 the cultural complex was dedicated. The cultural complex includes a museum and a replica of their home.

The grounds of the center also include a 12-acre landscaped park with paths, reflecting pool, fountain, and gazebo.

The Harry T. & Harriette V. Moore Memorial Park & Museum is an official landmark site of the United States Civil Right Trail.

References

Civil rights in the United States
Civil rights movement museums
Museums in Brevard County, Florida
2004 establishments in Florida